Group B of the 2022 FIFA World Cup took place from 21 to 29 November 2022. The group consisted of national association football teams from England, Iran, the United States and Wales. Both England and the United States progressed to the round of 16 undefeated. England won the group, winning two games and drawing the other, while the United States won one and drew the other two. Iran finished the group third, having won a single game, with Wales finishing fourth with a single point.

Initially noted for unusually containing four teams all ranked in the top 20 at the time of the tournament, as well as two teams within the same sovereign state and other geopolitical conflicts, various incidents relating to Qatar's ban on LGBTQ+ symbols affected the games on the first match day.

Teams
The teams were decided by the World Cup draw that took place on 1 April 2022. The group was set to receive one team from each pot, which sorted all World Cup teams by position on the FIFA World Rankings. The first team drawn was England, which secured qualification as a pot one team by winning Group I of UEFA qualification. The second pot team, the United States, qualified by finishing third in CONCACAF qualification. The third team was Iran, which won Group A of the AFC Third Round. The final team was not known at the time of the draw, as it was the UEFA Second Round Path A winner. Wales defeated Ukraine 1–0 to qualify for this position.

Group B was widely described as the "group of death" before the tournament. It had the highest average FIFA ranking of any group, and controversy given by the political hostility existing between Iran and the United Kingdom, and between Iran and the United States.

Notes

LGBT symbol incidents

Captains armbands

England captain Harry Kane, Wales captain Gareth Bale, and several other European captains intended to wear OneLove rainbow armbands promoting acceptance and diversity during the World Cup; shortly before England's opening match (the first match to feature one of these nations), however, FIFA announced that players wearing these armbands would face "unlimited" sanctions, with a yellow card given at minimum. The affected football associations said they would not put their players in this position, criticising FIFA for the ruling. A spokesperson for Rishi Sunak, the British Prime Minister, also criticised FIFA for introducing player punishment for the armbands. After the first United States match, and though the US had not been intending to wear the armband, Antony Blinken, the US Secretary of State, the nation's highest diplomat in Qatar, described the ban as "concerning".

At the England–Iran match, BBC pundit and former England women's team captain Alex Scott chose to wear a OneLove armband while being interviewed pitchside ahead of the match, a move that was praised. At the United States–Wales match, though she did not appear on screen, German ZDF broadcaster Claudia Neumann wore a rainbow armband and Pride shirt, later telling the Sport-Informations-Dienst that she wanted to set an example, lamenting that the captains would not be able to wear the armbands. During England's second match, the Wembley Stadium arch, iconic of the team's home stadium, was lit up in rainbow colours.

Other Pride items
Many Wales fans in attendance at their first match as part of the nation's official LGBTQ+ supporters group wore the group's rainbow Wales bucket hats. Women who had these hats, including former women's team captain Laura McAllister, were prohibited from entering the stadium with them; McAllister reported that the security officials told her it was "a banned symbol". At the same match, American journalist Grant Wahl was reportedly detained for 25 minutes when attempting to enter the stadium wearing a Pride shirt, being told it was "political" and being asked if he was British; he said that FIFA later apologised to him and security allowed him to enter with the shirt.

After the match, the Football Association of Wales confronted FIFA about the confiscation of the bucket hats, and FIFA entered talks with the Qatari Supreme Committee to discuss the Qatar commitment to make all fans welcome at the World Cup, also citing an incident of an American fan with a rainbow flag being harassed.

Standings

In the round of 16:
 The winners of Group B, England, advanced to play the runners-up of Group A, Senegal.
 The runners-up of Group B, the United States, advanced to play the winners of Group A, the Netherlands.

Matches
Matches took place between 21 to 29 November 2022. All times listed are local, AST (UTC+3).

England vs Iran
The opening match of Group B was contested between England and Iran. The two sides had never played each other in a competitive match. Many England supporters missed the start of the match due to problems with FIFA's ticketing app. In defiance of their government, the Iranian team refused to sing their national anthem ahead of the match, a sign of support for the Mahsa Amini protests in their own country. Many Iranian women, some of them bearing protest signs, were in attendance at the match, a gesture which by itself was considered an act of protest as women are barred from football matches in Iran.

The match was delayed for seven minutes in the first half after head to head collision between the Iranian goalkeeper Alireza Beiranvand and defender Majid Hosseini. Beiranvand initially seemed to be convinced to continue playing by Iran captain Ehsan Hajsafi despite appearing to be dazed and taking his gloves and shirt off after he received treatment, drawing criticism from the brain injury charity Headway. After collapsing on the field minutes later, Beiranvand was substituted for Hossein Hosseini. England scored three first-half goals: Jude Bellingham opened with his first ever senior England goal in the 35th minute, with Bukayo Saka (in the 43rd minute) and Raheem Sterling (in the first minute of stoppage time) being the other contributors to the scoreline up to this point.

In the second half, England's Saka scored his second of the game in the 62nd minute, before Iran's Mehdi Taremi scored with their first shot on target. England defender Harry Maguire was then removed from play after also suffering a head injury. Substitute Marcus Rashford, who had been introduced a minute before, scored England's fifth goal with his third touch of the game. Shortly into stoppage time, Jack Grealish scored England's sixth goal. The final goal, a contentious penalty kick for Iran, was scored two-and-a-half minutes after the final whistle, awarded only after a review of a late-occurring foul was suggested by the VAR. Taremi converted from the penalty kick, but the 6–2 defeat was Iran's worst in any FIFA World Cup match, surpassing its 4–1 defeat by Peru in 1978. The Iranian media blamed the "humiliating" loss on the protests in their country affecting their players' mindset, additionally claiming that the United States and its allies, including the United Kingdom, had manufactured the protests to disrupt Iran; though these nations comprise all of Iran's group stage competition, the line of blame is common due to longstanding political tensions.

United States vs Wales
The second match was between the United States and Wales. The teams met twice previously in friendly matches: the United States won 2–0 in 2003 and the two teams drew 0–0 in 2020. The game was broadcast on ITV in the United Kingdom, with the network announcing during the broadcast that its technical director, Roger Pearce, had died in Qatar.

The United States scored the opening goal in the 32nd minute when Tim Weah scored after a pass over the top by Christian Pulisic. The United States team outplayed Wales in the first half, but in the second half Wales outshone them, being tactically better, particularly after introducing substitute Kieffer Moore. Late into the second half, Bale was fouled in the box by Walker Zimmerman and scored the resulting penalty kick. After over nine minutes of stoppage time, the match finished 1–1 with the United States picking up four yellow cards, the most they had received since the 2002 FIFA World Cup match against Germany.

Wales vs Iran

Wales had faced Iran previously only once, in a friendly game in 1978 that ended in a 1–0 win for Wales. The Iranian team opted to sing their national anthem at this match. The game was driven by Iran in attack and quick counter-attack, with Wales mostly holding in defence; though Wales made attempts in attack, their midfield was described by BBC Sport's Dafydd Pritchard as "worryingly porous". In the first half, Iran had a goal from Ali Gholizadeh disallowed by VAR for offside. Early in the second half, Iran had two attempts hit each post in quick succession. 

In the 86th minute Welsh goalkeeper Wayne Hennessey was originally given a yellow card for a foul he committed outside his penalty area. However, on review by VAR, this was upgraded to a red card. Iran substitute Rouzbeh Cheshmi scored the first goal eight minutes into stoppage time, followed by Ramin Rezaeian scoring three minutes later to give Iran's first-ever win against a European team in the FIFA World Cup. Cheshmi's goal was the latest-minute match-winning goal scored in any World Cup game (excluding extra-time) since the 1966 FIFA World Cup in England when exact goal times were first made available. Officially, nine minutes of stoppage time were added; with further delays in the added time, over twelve minutes were actually played.

England vs United States
The teams had previously met twice in the World Cup. The United States won 1–0 in the 1950 FIFA World Cup in Brazil and the teams drew 1–1 in the 2010 FIFA World Cup in South Africa. United States captain Tyler Adams described their opponents as "an athletic team" and said that his own team was "really dominant at times" in their previous match against Wales, while England's Bellingham noted that the teams had been "talking some smack" on social media.

England's lineup remained unchanged, while the United States chose Haji Wright over Josh Sargent in attack. Harry Kane had a shot blocked in the box in the 9th minute before United States player Weston McKennie missed a shot in the six-yard box and Pulisic hit the crossbar in the 32nd minute. The match featured only a small number of chances, with only four shots on target between the two teams. Despite not losing the game, many England fans booed the team after the match ended.

Wales vs England
The teams had met 103 times, most recently in a friendly game in 2020 won 3–0 by England. This was their second meeting in a major tournament, the first being the group stage of UEFA Euro 2016 in France, which ended in a 2–1 win for England. The teams have met in multiple FIFA World Cup qualifiers, including two British Home Championship matches that served as World Cup qualifiers (in the 1949–50 British Home Championship and 1953–54 British Home Championship) as well as in the 1974 FIFA World Cup qualification – UEFA Group 5 and the 2006 FIFA World Cup qualification – UEFA Group 6 tournaments.

Marcus Rashford had the best chance of the first half, but his chipped shot was saved by Wales goalkeeper Danny Ward. The first half ended goalless, however, Rashford scored a direct free kick in the 51st minute to give England the lead. Shortly after the restart, Rashford won the ball in the Welsh defence and passed to Kane, who crossed the ball low from the right for Phil Foden to score at the back post. Rashford got his second of the game in the 68th minute with a shot from deep inside the Welsh penalty area that went through the goalkeeper's legs. The victory was enough for England to finish at the top of the group, whilst Wales finished at the bottom with just one point.

Iran vs United States
The teams had met twice previously. Iran won 2–1 in the 1998 FIFA World Cup in France and the teams drew 1–1 in 2000 friendly. Prior to the match the United States Soccer Federation displayed Iran’s national flag on social media without the emblem of the Islamic Republic. The removal of the emblem showed support for the women in Iran fighting for basic human rights, according to the Federation. In response, Iran state media reported that the United States should be immediately removed from the tournament and suspended for ten games for a “distorted image” of the country’s flag. Following this, the emblem was returned to the flag.

Both teams were guaranteed qualification to the round of 16 with a win, whilst Iran would qualify with a draw, provided Wales did not defeat England. Pulisic scored the only goal of the game for the United States in the 38th minute, being injured in the process. The United States team qualified to play the Netherlands in the round of 16, whilst England played Senegal.

Discipline
Fair play points would have been used as tiebreakers if the overall and head-to-head records of teams were tied. These were calculated based on yellow and red cards received in all group matches as follows:
first yellow card: −1 point;
indirect red card (second yellow card): −3 points;
direct red card: −4 points;
yellow card and direct red card: −5 points;

Only one of the above deductions was applied to a player in a single match.

Notes

References

External links

 

2022 FIFA World Cup
England at the 2022 FIFA World Cup
Iran at the 2022 FIFA World Cup
United States at the 2022 FIFA World Cup
Wales at the 2022 FIFA World Cup